Bolbitis heudelotii, also known as the African water fern, creeping fern, and Congo fern, is native to subtropical and tropical Africa, from Ethiopia west to Senegal; and down to northern South Africa.

Description
Bolbitis heudelotii, named for the botanical explorer of West Africa Jean-Pierre Heudelot (1802–1837), is an aquatic polypody fern growing submerged in rivers and streams, attached to rocks or wood by the threadlike rootlets extending from its rhizomes. It has dark green, pinnate leaves 15–40 cm long and 15–25 cm broad. It grows submerged. The water in its native habitat is fast-moving over sandy or rocky bottoms, very clean, not very hard and slightly acidic. The roots cling to rocks and the sandy beds.

Cultivation
In the aquarium, B. heudelotii requires water temperatures of 20–28 °C and moderately acidic ('soft') to neutral water with a pH range of 5.0–7.0, but tolerates a wide range of light levels. It does best in flowing water.

This species is often used as a midground specimen plant in tropical freshwater aquaria. Propagation is from divisions and cuttings from the rhizome.

It seems to be intolerant to being crowded and to fish excreta.  It is best grown secured to a piece of wood rather than planted direct in the substrate. Additional CO2 seems to boost growth and it grows best in a rather shady position.

Propagation is by division of the rhizome. It is a slow-growing plant.

References

External links 
 Tropica.dk
 AquaHobby

heudelotii
Ferns of Africa
Flora of Africa
Freshwater plants